Saleh Uddin Ahmed is a Bangladesh Nationalist Party politician. He was elected a member of parliament from Lalmonirhat-2 in February 1996.

Career 
Hasan was elected to parliament from Lalmonirhat-2 as a Bangladesh Nationalist Party candidate in 15 February 1996 Bangladeshi general election. He was defeated from Lalmonirhat-1 constituency on 2001 and 2008 on the nomination of Bangladesh Nationalist Party.

References 

Living people
Year of birth missing (living people)
People from Lalmonirhat District
Bangladesh Nationalist Party politicians
6th Jatiya Sangsad members